Pseudonympha is a genus of butterflies from the subfamily Satyrinae in the family Nymphalidae.

Species
Pseudonympha arnoldi van Son, 1941
Pseudonympha cyclops van Son, 1955
Pseudonympha gaika Riley, 1938
Pseudonympha hippia (Cramer, [1779])
Pseudonympha loxophthalma Vári, 1971
Pseudonympha machacha Riley, 1938
Pseudonympha magoides van Son, 1955
Pseudonympha magus (Fabricius, 1793)
Pseudonympha narycia Wallengren, 1857
Pseudonympha paludis Riley, 1938
Pseudonympha paragaika Vári, 1971
Pseudonympha penningtoni Riley, 1938
Pseudonympha poetula Trimen, 1891
Pseudonympha southeyi Pennington, 1953
Pseudonympha swanepoeli van Son, 1955
Pseudonympha trimenii Butler, 1868
Pseudonympha varii van Son, 1955

References

 
Satyrini
Butterfly genera
Taxa named by Hans Daniel Johan Wallengren